The Patin House, at 219 W. Bridge St. in Breaux Bridge, Louisiana, was built in 1895.  It was listed on the National Register of Historic Places in 1991.

It includes elements of Stick/eastlake and Queen Anne style.

References

National Register of Historic Places in St. Martin Parish, Louisiana
Queen Anne architecture in Louisiana
Houses completed in 1895